Joseph John Kantor, Jr. (born December 17, 1942, in Parma Heights, Ohio — died October 2, 2021) was a former American football halfback in the National Football League for the Washington Redskins.  He played college football at the University of Notre Dame.

References

1942 births
Living people
People from Parma Heights, Ohio
American football halfbacks
Notre Dame Fighting Irish football players
Washington Redskins players